Memoirs of Lady Jo of Pungyang (自記錄; 자긔록, Jagirok) is a memoir written in hangul, or the Korean alphabet, in the late 18th century by Lady Jo of Pungyang (豊壤趙氏, 1772-1815), a noblewoman from the Joseon Dynasty. This memoir consists of a preface, which states the purpose of her writing; a body that depicts her childhood as well as her husband’s fight against illness and death; an epilogue written after the death of her father and her young brother (whom she adopted as her own son); funeral orations written by relatives after her husband’s death; and her elder sister’s afterword on transcribing the book. Among these, the preface and body were written in 1792; the epilogue, in 1805. For other sections of the book, it is unclear when they were written.

Authorship 
Lady Jo of Pungyang was born as the second daughter of Jo Gam (趙𣊟, 1744–1804) and Lady Ha of Jinju (晋州河氏), a daughter of Ha Myeong-sang (河命祥), and she married Kim Gi-hwa (金基和, 1772–1791). The Jo clan of Pungyang was a prestigious clan during the late Joseon Dynasty. However, her paternal grandfather was a concubine’s son, and her father Jo Gam passed a high-level military examination and served as a district magistrate. Her husband Kim Gi-hwa’s great grandfather passed a high-level military examination and served as a district magistrate, but his grandfather and father did not hold civil posts. Thus, the clans of her father and mother were both military clans who had lived in Seoul for generations. As of Lady Jo, there is nothing known about her, except for what is written in her memoir.

Plot 
Jagirok describes the author’s own childhood; her marriage and the illness and death of her husband; and her life afterward. Regarding her childhood, even though she mentions her father and elder sister, she mostly talks about her mother. She depicts in great detail how her mother had become weak after a series of childbirths and eventually passed away as a result.

Her childhood story is followed by the story of her marriage, mostly the illness and death of her husband Kim Gi-hwa, who was of the same age with her. She illustrates the cause of his illness, his suffering and treatment, the aggravation of his illness, her attempt to prick herself and shed blood, her suicidal thoughts, her husband’s funeral, and her life afterward.

Features and significance 
Jagirok is significant in that it is a rare autobiography of a traditional Korean woman. Even though her stories mostly revolve around her family (e.g. mother and husband) rather than “I,” she reflects on herself through her relationships with other family members. In this regard, Jagirok is comparable with proses that record a woman’s life, such as Hanjungnok (閑中錄 A Record of Sorrowful Days), and gasa (a type of poetry popular during the Joseon Dynasty) that relates women’s lives.

This memoir has a unique woman’s voice that is not present in biographies of exemplary women written in the late Joseon period. At the time, many male authors wrote about devoted women who hurt their body to save their husbands in times of crisis or who killed themselves following the deaths of their husbands. However, these works did not reflect women’s own positions. Jagirok is an important work of literature as it clearly shows a woman’s voice.

Furthermore, Jagirok serves as historical records of aristocratic family culture in Seoul during the late 18th century. The narration of her life stories naturally reveals the culture of the time, such as the marriage customs of aristocratic families and how people treated illness. In particular, this memoir provides detailed accounts of her husband’s illness and treatment, thereby serving as a clinical report.

Other 
The Korean drama Saimdang, Memoir of Colors was inspired by Jagirok.

Texts 
The only surviving transcribed copy of Jagirok is housed in the National Library of Korea. It is presumed that this is not the original manuscript written by Lady Jo of Pungyang but a copy transcribed by her elder sister. It was first introduced to academia in 2001 by Korean classical literature scholar Park Ok-ju.

References

Further reading 
 Lady Jo of Pungyang. Memoirs of Lady Jo of Pungyang. Seoul: Nauisigan, 2014.

Joseon dynasty works